Harissa is a Tunisian hot red sauce or paste.

Harissa may also refer to:

 Harissa (dish), an Armenian porridge made of chicken and wheat
 Harissa, Lebanon, a mountain village

See also
 Harisa or Harees, an Arabic dish of wheat, meat and salt
 Basbousa, a dessert made from semolina, sometimes referred to as "hareesa"